Roy Hobbs (born 13 August 1989) is a Singaporean tennis player.

Hobbs has a career high ATP singles ranking of 1346 achieved on 21 March 2016. He also has a career high ATP doubles ranking of 1166 achieved on 11 April 2016.

Hobbs represents Singapore at the Davis Cup, where he has a W/L record of 37–23. He owns the most Davis Cup wins for Singapore.

References

External links

1989 births
Living people
Singaporean tennis players
Competitors at the 2015 Southeast Asian Games
Competitors at the 2017 Southeast Asian Games
Southeast Asian Games competitors for Singapore